

Champions
National Association: Boston Base Ball Club

National Association final standings

Statistical leaders

Notable seasons
Boston Red Stockings second baseman Ross Barnes leads the NA with 138 hits, 43 stolen bases, 125 runs scored, a .431 batting average, a 1.080 OPS, and a 207 OPS+.
Boston Red Stockings pitcher Al Spalding has a record of 41-14, leading the NA with 41 wins and 496.2 innings pitched. His 50 strikeouts rank second in the league. He has a 2.99 earned run average and a 115 ERA+.

Events

January–March
March 3 – For the first time, the NA adopts a standardized ball to be used in all league games.

April–June
May 14 – Nearly 5,000 fans watch the upstart Philadelphia Club defeat the established Athletics 5–4 in 13 innings.  Only once before, in 1865, had that many innings been played in one game.
June 7 – Mutual and Philadelphia combine for 40 errors.  The Philadelphias, aided by the Mutuals' 26 miscues, win 12–10.
June 11 – 10,000 fans are in attendance see Philadelphia score 5 runs in the 7th inning to defeat Athletic 7–5.

July–September
July 4 – Leading 11–3 over Resolute of Elizabeth, the Bostons score 21 runs in the bottom of the 9th inning for a 32–3 victory.  The home-ahead rule would not be instituted for 6 more years. 
July 22 – Tom Barlow of Atlantic lays down 6 bunts, all for hits, in a game against Lord Baltimore.
July 24 – Bob Ferguson of the Atlantic is the umpire in a game between Mutual of New York and Lord Baltimore which ends with the Mutuals scoring 3 runs in the bottom of the 9th for an 11–10 victory.  Ferguson and Mutual's Nat Hicks get into an altercation with Ferguson breaking Hicks' arm by hitting him with a bat.  Ferguson requires a police escort to leave the field and Hicks will be out for 2 months due to the incident.
August 16 – Boston defeats Philadelphia 11–8 in Chicago in front of several thousand fans.  After the game, it is announced that Chicago has signed several players in hopes of placing a team in the NA for the 1874 season.

October–December
October 16 – Lord Baltimore turns a triple play in a losing cause against Philadelphia.
October 22 – Boston wins the pennant for the 2nd year in a row.  They clinch on the same date as they had in 1872.
November 6 – A crosstown benefit game is played between the Philadelphia and Athletic Clubs under a proposed rule of 10 men on the field and 10 innings for a game.  The extra player is placed on the infield as a right shortstop and with most observers feeling the extra player unnecessary, the rule is never implemented.

Births
January 10 – Chick Stahl
January 10 – Jack O'Neill
January 19 – Arlie Pond
January 23 – Red Donahue
February 5 – Jack O'Brien
February 20 – Tom O'Brien
March 10 – Gene DeMontreville
March 29 – Duff Cooley
April 7 – John McGraw
April 22 – Frank Figgemeier 
May 23 – "Brewery" Jack Taylor
June 13 – Walter Coleman
July 11 – Jimmy Slagle
July 19 – Harry Davis
August 26 – Chick Fraser
October 5 – Claude Ritchey
October 9 – Bill Reidy
November 4 – Bobby Wallace
November 10 – Willie McGill
November 24 – Ed Doheny
November 29 – Jake Weimer
December 6 – Harry Wolverton
December 9 – Oscar Purner
December 14 – John Anderson

Deaths
February 26 – Cy Bentley, 22, pitcher and right fielder for the 1872 Middletown Mansfields.

External links
1873 season at Baseball-Reference.com
Charlton's Baseball Chronology at BaseballLibrary.com
Retrosheet.org

References
Levine, Peter (1985). A.G. Spalding and the Rise of Baseball: The Promise of American Sport. New York: Oxford University Press.